Philadelphia Freedom  may refer to:

 "Philadelphia Freedom" (song), a 1975 number one song by Elton John
 Philadelphia Freedom (soccer), a soccer club that competed in the USISL and the USISL Pro League
 Philadelphia Freedom (album), a 1975 album by MFSB
 Philadelphia Freedom Concert, a 2005 fundraiser headlined by Elton John

See also
Philadelphia Freedoms, a World TeamTennis franchise
Philadelphia Freedoms (1974), a defunct World TeamTennis franchise